Henry Marshall Wallace (born September 26, 1938) is a former American football player who played with the Los Angeles Chargers. He played college football at the University of the Pacific.

References

1938 births
Living people
American football defensive backs
Pacific Tigers football players
Los Angeles Chargers players
Players of American football from Bakersfield, California